Thirteen Ways to Look at Birds is a studio album by Australian musicians Paul Kelly, and James Ledger featuring Alice Keath and Seraphim Trio . The album was released on 30 August 2019 and peaked at number 43 on the ARIA Charts.

The albums brings six musicians together to interpret bird inspired poems, written by John Keats, Thomas Hardy, Emily Dickinson, Judith Wright, Gerard Manley Hopkins, Gwen Harwood, A D Hope and others.

At the ARIA Music Awards of 2019, the album won ARIA Award for Best Classical Album.

Track listing

Charts

Release history

References

2019 albums
Paul Kelly (Australian musician) albums
ARIA Award-winning albums